Eleftheriou may refer to:

 Andrew Eleftheriou (born 1997), English footballer
 Andri Eleftheriou (born 1984), Cypriot sport shooter
 Eleftheria Eleftheriou (born 1989), Greek-Cypriot singer, musician, and actress
 Eleftherios Eleftheriou (born 1974), Cypriot footballer
 Evangelos S. Eleftheriou, Greek electrical engineer
 Georgios Eleftheriou (born 1984), Cypriot footballer
 Eleftheriou Venizelou Street, street in Patras, Greece